The Keriau or Krio River is a tributary of the Pawan River in West Kalimantan, Indonesia.

Hydrology 
The upper course of the river was the location of the Ulu Aik Kingdom (est. around 1700), later renamed Hulu Aik.

The Krio River rapids are reached by starting from Pontianak in the direction of Ketapang by speedboat for six hours, then a four-hour trip in a smaller boat.

Geography 
The river flows in the western area of Borneo island with predominantly tropical rainforest climate (designated as Af in the Köppen-Geiger climate classification). The annual average temperature in the area is 23 °C. The warmest month is May, when the average temperature is around 24 °C, and the coldest is December, at 22 °C. The average annual rainfall is 3726 mm. The wettest month is December, with an average of 495 mm rainfall, and the driest is August, with 160 mm rainfall.

See also
List of rivers of Indonesia
List of rivers of Kalimantan

References

Rivers of West Kalimantan
Rivers of Indonesia